Alex Marchadier (born 26 September 1998) is a French professional footballer who plays as derender for  club Le Puy.

Career
Marchadier was a member of the youth academy of Marseille, but left the club in the summer of 2016 after refusing a contrat pro stagiaire (professional trainee contract). He had trials with Benfica and Juventus, but was without a club until signing for Moulins Yzeure Foot in the summer of 2017.

On 12 June 2019, Marchadier signed a three-year contract with Orléans. He made his senior debut with Orléans in a 4–1 Ligue 2 loss to Lens on 7 October 2019.

Honours 
Le Puy

 Championnat National 2: 2021–22

References

External links
 
 
 
 
 OM 1899 Profile

1998 births
Living people
Sportspeople from Clermont-Ferrand
Association football defenders
French footballers
US Orléans players
Le Puy Foot 43 Auvergne players
Ligue 2 players
Championnat National players
Championnat National 2 players
Championnat National 3 players
Footballers from Auvergne-Rhône-Alpes